The Rhodocyclaceae are a family of gram-negative bacteria.  They are given their own order in the beta subgroup of Pseudomonadota, and include many genera previously assigned to the family Pseudomonadaceae.

The family was revised in 2017 with the creation of other families within the order Rhodocyclales, and the family now contains the genera:
Rhodocyclus (type genus) species can grow photoheterotrophically or photoautotrophically (using molecular hydrogen as their electron donor) under anoxia or heterotrophically on fatty acids under air. Dominant respiratory quinone is rhodoquinone-8. Cells are curved rods or rings.
Propionivibrio species grow anaerobically by fermentation of hydrocarbons, yielding fatty acids, specifically propionate. The dominant respiratory quinone is ubiquinone-8. Cells are curved rods.
Azospira species are heterotrophs that can fix molecular nitrogen (i.e. are diazotrophic) as their source of nitrogen for growth. Cells are spirillae or curved rods. The dominant respiratory quinone is ubiquinone-8.

References

External links
 Rhodocyclaceae J.P. Euzéby: List of Prokaryotic names with Standing in Nomenclature

 
Rhodocyclales